A fairy godmother is a fairy who acts as a mentor or guardian for a young person.

 Fairy godmother may also refer to:

Art, entertainment, and media

Fictional entities
 Fairy Godmother, a character in Disney's 1950 film Cinderella
 Fairy Godmother (Shrek), a character in the movie Shrek 2

Games
 Fairy Godmother Tycoon, a game by Pogo.com

Literature
 The Fairy Godmother (novel), 2004 novel and book 1 of Mercedes Lackey's Tales of the Five Hundred Kingdoms series

Other uses
Fairy godmother or fag hag, a slang term in the gay community
Fairy godmother, a female mentor or sponsor

See also
 Godfather (disambiguation)
 Godmother (disambiguation)